Mary DePiero (born 14 May 1968) is a Canadian diver.

DePiero competed in the 1992 Summer Olympics in Barcelona. She won a gold medal in the 1m springboard event at the 1990 Commonwealth Games and a bronze medal in the same event at the 1994 Commonwealth Games.

References

1968 births
Living people
Sportspeople from Thunder Bay
Olympic divers of Canada
Canadian female divers
Divers at the 1992 Summer Olympics
Divers at the 1990 Commonwealth Games
Divers at the 1994 Commonwealth Games
Commonwealth Games gold medallists for Canada
Commonwealth Games bronze medallists for Canada
Commonwealth Games medallists in diving
20th-century Canadian women
Medallists at the 1990 Commonwealth Games
Medallists at the 1994 Commonwealth Games